The 1947–48 Scottish Division A was won by Hibernian. Airdrieonians and Queen's Park finished 15th and 16th respectively and were relegated to the 1948–49 Scottish Division B.

League table

Results

References

1947–48 Scottish Football League
Scottish Division One seasons
Scot